Grandi is an Italian surname. Notable people with the surname include:

Alessandro Grandi (1586–1630), Italian composer
Allegro Grandi (1910-1973), Italian cyclist
Bruno Grandi (1934–2019), Italian gymnast
Daniele Grandi (born 1993), Italian footballer
Dino Grandi (1895–1988), Italian politician
Ercole Grandi (1491–1531), Italian painter
Filippo Grandi (born 1957), Italian diplomat
Giuseppe Grandi (1843-1894), Italian sculptor
 Guido Grandi (priest) (1671–1742), Italian priest and mathematician
 Guido Grandi (entomologist) (1886–1970), Italian entomologist
Irene Grandi (1969), Italian singer
Luigi Guido Grandi (1671-1742), Italian monk, priest, philosopher, theologian, mathematician, and engineer
Margherita Grandi (Margaret Gard) (1892–1971), Australian soprano
Marta Grandi (1915–2005), Italian entomologist
Matías Grandi (born 1998), Argentine footballer 
Matteo Grandi (born 1992), Italian footballer 
Serena Grandi (1958), Italian actress
Stefano Grandi (born 1962), Italian swimmer
Thomas Grandi (1972), Canadian alpine skier

Fictional characters
Kari Grandi, protagonist in the Finnish television advertisements for Grandi juice brand

See also
Benigno De Grandi (1924-2014), Italian professional football player and manager
Il Kal grandi, place of worsphip of the Sephardi community in Sarajevo, Bosnia
Grandi's series, a certain infinite mathematical series (after Guido Grandi)
Grandi non immerito, a papal bull issued by Pope Innocent IV on 24 July 1245
Ospedali Grandi, four great Venetian hospitals (also referred to as the Ospedali Maggiori) 
HB Grandi, Icelandic fishing company
Grandis (disambiguation)

Italian-language surnames